Events from the year 1951 in Sweden

Incumbents
 Monarch – Gustaf VI Adolf 
 Prime Minister – Tage Erlander

Events

Births

 17 April – Börje Salming, ice hockey player (died 2022).
 12 May – Gunnar Larsson, swimmer.
 14 May – Anders Paulrud, writer (died 2008).
 13 June – Stellan Skarsgård, actor.
 19 December – Ulf Olsson, convicted murderer (died 2010).

Deaths
 12 January – Gustaf Boivie, sport shooter (born 1864).
 26 October – Herbert Lindström, tug-of-war competitor, Olympic champion from 2012 (born 1886).
 25 December – Filip Ericsson, sailor (born 1882).

References

 
Sweden
Years of the 20th century in Sweden